The 10.4mm Swiss centerfire revolver cartridge was used in the Ordnance Revolver models 1872/78 and 1878 of the Swiss Army.  The case is of brass; the bullet is of hardened lead.

Dimensions

References

External links

 This entry is derived from the reading of the following specialized French-language magazines:
 Cibles (Fr)
 AMI (B, discontinued in 1988)
 Gazette des armes (Fr)
 Action Guns (Fr)

Pistol and rifle cartridges
Military cartridges